Sagar is a census-designated place (CDP) in McKinley County, New Mexico, United States. It was first listed as a CDP prior to the 2020 census.

Demographics

Education
It is in Gallup-McKinley County Public Schools.

Residents are zoned to David Skeet Elementary School, Gallup Middle School, and Hiroshi Miyamura High School.

References 

Census-designated places in McKinley County, New Mexico
Census-designated places in New Mexico